Robert E. Mnuchin (born 1933) is an American  art dealer and former banker. He is the founder of the Mnuchin Gallery at 45 East 78th Street, New York. He is the father of Steven Mnuchin, who was the United States Secretary of the Treasury in the Trump administration.

Early life
Mnuchin was born in 1933, and grew up in Scarsdale, New York. His parents, Harriet (Gevirtz) and Leon A. Mnuchin, were "modest collectors" of art. He graduated from Yale University in 1955.

Career
After graduating from Yale, Mnuchin served in the Army for two years and subsequently joined Goldman Sachs in 1957, staying there for 33 years. Mnuchin was named a general partner in 1967, headed the trading and arbitrage division in 1976, and joined the management committee in 1980. He, along with his co-worker at Goldman Gus Levy, developed Goldman's block trading business and ran the firm's equities division until his retirement in 1990. In his final year before retirement, he earned a reported $8.7 million salary.

In 1992, Mnuchin opened his gallery, C & M Arts, with James Corcoran, a Los Angeles-based dealer. In 2005, the name of gallery was changed to L&M Arts when he entered into partnership with Dominique Lévy; she left in 2013 to open her own gallery nearby.

Personal life
Mnuchin's first wife was Elaine Terner Cooper. They had two children. One son, Alan G. Mnuchin, was a vice president at Goldman Sachs in 1995, when he married Kimberly E. Kassel. The second son, Steven Mnuchin, also became a banker with Goldman Sachs. and Secretary of Treasury under Donald Trump. In 1999 Cooper was a vice president of the Solomon R. Guggenheim Museum's international directors council, and a director of the Byrd Hoffman Foundation. She died on 14 May 2005.

Mnuchin married his second wife Adriana in 1963. Adriana Mnuchin founded retail enterprises Tennis Lady (22 stores in the US and Canada) and Cashmere-Cashmere (4 stores in New York and New Jersey). In 1995, she co-founded The Shakespeare Society (the first in the USA) and in 2009, Roundtable Cultural Seminars, an adult continuing education organization. Robert and Adriana Mnuchin have one child together: a daughter, Valerie Mnuchin. His step-daughter, Lisa Abelow Hedley, was nominated for an Emmy award for documentary film, and is married to the writer of Flashdance and producer of Flashdance: The Musical, Tom Hedley, and they have four children together.

In 1990, Mnuchin and his wife Adriana bought the Mayflower Inn, a country house hotel in Washington, Connecticut, which they turned into a Relais & Chateaux 30-room hotel, spa and restaurant, before selling it in 2007. In 2011, they purchased a  Upper East Side house at 14 East 95th Street from Solomon Asser for $14.25 million, using his company, Nuke Properties LLC. Initially listed in 2014 at $17 million, it sold in January 2016 to Alastair and Alisa Wood for a reported $13 million.

Contemporary art purchased by Mnuchin on 16 May 2019 broke the record price for a work by a living artist. Jeff Koons' 1986 stainless steel sculpture titled Rabbit was purchased at an auction in New York for 91.1 million.

References

1933 births
Living people
People from Scarsdale, New York
Yale University alumni
American art dealers
American bankers
20th-century American Jews
Goldman Sachs people
21st-century American Jews